Hypnomonas is a genus of green algae, in the family Hypnomonadaceae. Its sole species is Hypnomonas tuberculata.

References

External links

Scientific references

Scientific databases
 AlgaTerra database
 Index Nominum Genericorum

Chlamydomonadales genera
Chlamydomonadales
Monotypic algae genera